The 1965 CFL season is considered to be the 12th season in modern-day Canadian football, although it is officially the eighth Canadian Football League season.

CFL News in 1965
The Canadian Football League commissioned an economic study of Canadian football and all its aspects.  The Canadian Football League Players' Association was formed and had their first meetings on May 15 and 16 in Toronto.

Regular season standings

Final regular season standings
Note: GP = Games Played, W = Wins, L = Losses, T = Ties, PF = Points For, PA = Points Against, Pts = Points

Bold text means that they have clinched the playoffs.
 Calgary and Hamilton have first round byes.

Grey Cup playoffs
Note: All dates in 1965

Conference Semi-Finals

 The Rough Riders will play the Hamilton Tiger-Cats in the Eastern Finals.

 The Blue Bombers will play the Calgary Stampeders in the Western Finals.

Conference Finals

Playoff bracket

Grey Cup Championship

CFL Leaders
 CFL Passing Leaders
 CFL Rushing Leaders
 CFL Receiving Leaders

1965 CFL All-Stars

Offence
QB – Ken Ploen, Winnipeg Blue Bombers
RB – George Reed, Saskatchewan Roughriders
RB – Bo Scott, Ottawa Rough Riders
RB – Lovell Coleman, Calgary Stampeders
TE – Tommy Joe Coffey, Edmonton Eskimos
SE – Ted Watkins, Ottawa Rough Riders
F – Hugh Campbell, Saskatchewan Roughriders
C – Ted Urness, Saskatchewan Roughriders
OG – Al Benecick, Saskatchewan Roughriders
OG – Tony Pajaczkowski, Calgary Stampeders
OT – Frank Rigney, Winnipeg Blue Bombers
OT – Bronko Nagurski Jr., Hamilton Tiger-Cats

Defence
DT – John Barrow, Hamilton Tiger-Cats
DT – Pat Holmes, Calgary Stampeders
DE – Billy Ray Locklin, Hamilton Tiger-Cats
DE – Dick Fouts, BC Lions
LB – Wayne Harris, Calgary Stampeders
LB – Ken Lehmann, Ottawa Rough Riders
LB – Zeno Karcz, Hamilton Tiger-Cats
DB – Garney Henley, Hamilton Tiger-Cats
DB – Billy Wayte, Hamilton Tiger-Cats
DB – Dick Thornton, Winnipeg Blue Bombers
DB – Jerry Keeling, Calgary Stampeders
DB – Gene Gaines, Ottawa Rough Riders

1965 Eastern All-Stars

Offence
QB – Bernie Faloney, Montreal Alouettes
RB – Jim Dillard, Ottawa Rough Riders
RB – Bo Scott, Ottawa Rough Riders
RB – Dave Thelen, Toronto Argonauts
TE – Stan Crisson, Hamilton Tiger-Cats
SE – Ted Watkins, Ottawa Rough Riders
F – Terry Evanshen, Montreal Alouettes
C – Norm Stoneburgh, Toronto Argonauts
OG – Chuck Walton, Hamilton Tiger-Cats
OG – John Pentecost, Ottawa Rough Riders
OT – Moe Racine, Ottawa Rough Riders
OT – Bronko Nagurski Jr., Hamilton Tiger-Cats

Defence
DT – John Barrow, Hamilton Tiger-Cats
DT – Angelo Mosca, Hamilton Tiger-Cats
DE – Billy Ray Locklin, Hamilton Tiger-Cats
DE – John Baker, Montreal Alouettes
LB – Ron Brewer, Toronto Argonauts
LB – Ken Lehmann, Ottawa Rough Riders
LB – Zeno Karcz, Hamilton Tiger-Cats
DB – Garney Henley, Hamilton Tiger-Cats
DB – Billy Wayte, Hamilton Tiger-Cats
DB – Don Sutherin, Hamilton Tiger-Cats
DB – Bob O'Billovich, Ottawa Rough Riders
DB – Gene Gaines, Ottawa Rough Riders

1965 Western All-Stars

Offence
QB – Ken Ploen, Winnipeg Blue Bombers
RB – George Reed, Saskatchewan Roughriders
RB – Dave Raimey, Winnipeg Blue Bombers
RB – Lovell Coleman, Calgary Stampeders
RB – Jim Thomas, Edmonton Eskimos
TE – Tommy Joe Coffey, Edmonton Eskimos
TE – Herm Harrison, Calgary Stampeders
F – Hugh Campbell, Saskatchewan Roughriders
C – Ted Urness, Saskatchewan Roughriders
OG – Al Benecick, Saskatchewan Roughriders
OG – Tony Pajaczkowski, Calgary Stampeders
OT – Frank Rigney, Winnipeg Blue Bombers
OT – Clyde Brock, Saskatchewan Roughriders

Defence
DT – Mike Cacic,  BC Lions
DT – Pat Holmes, Calgary Stampeders
DE – E.A. Sims, Edmonton Eskimos
DE – Dick Fouts, BC Lions
LB – Wayne Harris, Calgary Stampeders
LB – Al Miller, Winnipeg Blue Bombers
LB – Jim Furlong, Calgary Stampeders
DB – Dale West, Saskatchewan Roughriders
DB – Henry Janzen, Winnipeg Blue Bombers
DB – Dick Thornton, Winnipeg Blue Bombers
DB – Jerry Keeling, Calgary Stampeders
DB – Larry Robinson, Calgary Stampeders

1965 CFL Awards
 CFL's Most Outstanding Player Award – George Reed (RB), Saskatchewan Roughriders
 CFL's Most Outstanding Canadian Award – Zeno Karcz (LB), Hamilton Tiger-Cats
 CFL's Most Outstanding Lineman Award – Wayne Harris (LB), Calgary Stampeders
 CFL's Coach of the Year – Bud Grant, Winnipeg Blue Bombers
 Jeff Russel Memorial Trophy (Eastern MVP) – Bernie Faloney (QB), Montreal Alouettes
 Jeff Nicklin Memorial Trophy (Western MVP) - George Reed (RB), Saskatchewan Roughriders
 Gruen Trophy (Eastern Rookie of the Year) - Terry Evanshen (WR), Montreal Alouettes
 Dr. Beattie Martin Trophy (Western Rookie of the Year) - Ron Forwick (DE), Edmonton Eskimos
 DeMarco–Becket Memorial Trophy (Western Outstanding Lineman) - Dick Fouts (DE), BC Lions

References 

Canadian Football League seasons
CFL